Jerry Clark (born February 27, 1932) is a former American football player and coach football, basketball, and baseball.  He served as the head football coach at Cornell College in Mount Vernon, Iowa from 1959 to 1986, compiling a record of 159–85–1.  Clark attended the University of Iowa, where he played football as a guard in 1952 and 1953, before graduating in 1954.  He coached football at Fort Carson in Colorado in 1954 and 1955 before returning to the state of Iowa to coach high school football.  Clark led Grinnell High School to a record of 6–3 in 1956, before moving to Mason City High School, where he guided the Mohawks to a records of 2–5–1 in 1957 and 4–4 in 1958.  Clark was also an assistant basketball coach at Cornell from 1959 to 1971, the school's head golf coach from 1959 to 1974, and the school's head baseball coach from 1981 to 1984.

References

1932 births
Living people
American football guards
Cornell Rams baseball coaches
Cornell Rams football coaches
Cornell Rams men's basketball coaches
Iowa Hawkeyes football players
College golf coaches in the United States
High school football coaches in Iowa